Pomorie is a Bulgarian municipal association football club based in Pomorie, that competes in the A RFG Burgas, the fourth tier of Bulgarian football. The club plays its home matches at the Pomorie Stadium, which has an overall capacity of 2,000 seats.

Honours

Second League:
  Runners-up (2): 2010-11, 2015-16

Third League: 
  Winners (1): 2002/03 

Bulgarian Cup
  Runners-up (1): 2010

Cup of Bulgarian Amateur Football League
  Winners (2): 2002/03, 2008/09

History

First years
The football club in Pomorie was established in 1934. In 1944 became Nikolay Luskov in honour of the famous Bulgarian communist politic with the same name, who died in the town. Since then, the club changed its name twice, as Cherveno Zname and FC Pomorie, without making some important achievements.

2002–2009
However, in 2002, the club managed to earn a promotion to the Bulgarian V AFG. The next season, the club was bought by the Bulgarian oil company Petrol AD, and the same 2003-04 season the team achieved a double by winning the South-East V AFG and the Bulgarian Amateur Cup, again under the name  FC Pomorie.

The following two seasons Pomorie competed in the Bulgarian B PFG, but in 2006, were once again relegated to the V AFG. In the next years, the club stayed in the South-East V AFG, without achieving any significant results. In 2009, however, PFC Pomorie finished in the third position of their division and were able to play a play-off match for a promotion to the Bulgarian B PFG.

Union with Naftex Burgas
On July 3, 2009, PFC Pomorie merged with Naftex Burgas from the nearby city Burgas, by demands from the Petrol AD owner Mitko Sabev. However, the old club was folded and a new club was established by the fans as a successor of the old team. Therefore, only part of the Naftex players were moved to the Pomorie team. The newly created club was named Chernomorets Pomorie and several days later the club obtained a license from the BFU in order to participate in the East B PFG. As of 2009 Chernomorets Pomorie is used as a satellite team for Chernomorets Burgas and has a goal to train and develop players, seeking promotion to the first squad in the main club.

At the end of the 2010/2011 B PFG season, Chernomorets Pomorie finished in 2nd place, securing the right to challenge Vidima Rakovski for a spot in the A PFG, the top echelon in Bulgaria. However, they were ultimately denied a professional license by the Bulgarian Football Union and FC Sportist Svoge will face the team from Sevlievo.
Since season 2014/2015 OFC Pomorie has participated in the South-Eastern 3rd football division.

Final of Bulgarian Cup

On April 28, 2010, Chernomorets Pomorie surprisingly managed to secure a place in the final of the Bulgarian Cup after securing some prestigious wins against Minyor Pernik (2:0) and Kaliakra Kavarna (4:1 after penalties) at the Pomorie Stadium. Chernomorets's players are the second ones from a B PFG team in the Bulgarian Cup history, that have reached the final of the competition since Chernomorets Burgas's similar achievement in 1989. The final of the cup was held on May 5, 2010, against Beroe Stara Zagora at the Lovech Stadium, but it was lost by the Pomorie with 0:1.

Difficult Years
On 23 May 2012 was the last game of team. In June 2012 Chernomorets Pomorie and Akademik Sofia did not receive a professional license from the BFU and were relegated to the third division. The team denied to compete in V Grupa and any other division due to financial problems. On 15 September 2012 its changes the name to OFC Pomorie. The youth academy of the club currently competes in youth divisions.

New beginning
On 22 July 2013 the main team made its first training and during 2013-14 season competed in the regional divisions. The team quickly progressed, winning the Third League in the season 2014-15, thus promoting to the second division, where they currently play. 

Pomorie was disqualified from the second level after the 2019–20 season due to financial problems. The club did not apply for entry to the Third League due to continuing financial trouble.

Historical names

League positions

Past seasons

Stadium and Sports Complex

Chernomorets Pomorie currently play their home matches at the Pomorie Stadium in Pomorie. The stadium has an overall capacity of 3,000 spectators and it is part of a major training sports complex located in the range of a 5-star luxury hotel complex, which is also used by the needs of the football club. The venue has one main stand with roof covers, a 1400 lux floodlight system, a frame scoreboard and a synthetic grass pitch surface. It was built in 2006, along with the Pomorie Sports Complex at a total cost of € 3,25 million.

Players

Current squad
As of 20 August 2019

For recent transfers, see Transfers summer 2019.

Foreign players
Only one non-EU national can be registered and given a squad number for the first team in the Bulgarian Second League. Those non-EU nationals with European ancestry can claim citizenship from the nation their ancestors came from. If a player does not have European ancestry, he can claim Bulgarian citizenship after playing in Bulgaria for 5 years.

EU Nationals
 Wilfried Grimaud
 Josué Ntoya

EU Nationals (Dual citizenship)

Non-EU Nationals

Staff

References

External links
Official website
Unofficial website

Football clubs in Bulgaria
1934 establishments in Bulgaria
Association football clubs established in 1934
Pomorie